Maruvesa is a settlement in Kenya's Kwale County, of the former Coast Province.

Geography 
The average land elevation is 263 metres above sea-level.

References 

Populated places in Coast Province